Herb Klein or Herbert Klein may refer to:
 Herb Klein (journalist) (1918–2009), American press secretary to Richard Nixon
 Herbert Klein (swimmer) (1923–2001), German swimmer
 Herb Klein (politician) (born 1930), United States Representative from New Jersey
 Herbert S. Klein, American historian